The Yi Yuan Mansion or Maxing Chen Yi-Yuan Family Mansion is a historical house in Xiushui Township, Changhua County, Taiwan. It is the largest old mansion in the county.

History
The mansion was built in 1846 by the Chen Family, featuring 3 halls, 6 wing rooms, and over 90 rooms. The compound consists of outer courtyard, gatehouse, front courtyard, front gate, atrium, sedan chair hall, main hall, backyard, and rear hall, occupying nearly one hectare of land.

See also
 List of tourist attractions in Taiwan

References

1846 establishments in Taiwan
Buildings and structures in Changhua County
Houses completed in 1846
Houses in Taiwan
National monuments of Taiwan